The 1997–98 Czech 1.liga season was the fifth season of the Czech 1.liga, the second level of ice hockey in the Czech Republic. 14 teams participated in the league, and HC Znojemsti Orli won the championship.

Regular season

Relegation 
 HC Prostějov – HC Šumperk 4:1 (5:1, 2:3, 5:1, 3:2, 6:3)
 HC Přerov – SK Kadaň 2:4 (0:5, 2:3, 2:0, 4:1, 0:3, 1:2)

External links
 Season on hockeyarchives.info

2
Czech
Czech 1. Liga seasons